Lara Vieceli (born 16 July 1993) is an Italian racing cyclist, who rides for UCI Women's Continental Team . She competed in the 2013 UCI women's team time trial in Florence.

Major results

2015
 3rd Giro del Trentino Alto Adige-Südtirol
 10th Overall Trophée d'Or Féminin
1st Young rider classification
2016
 4th Overall Giro della Toscana Int. Femminile – Memorial Michela Fanini
1st Mountains classification
 7th Overall Tour de Bretagne Féminin
1st Prologue
 10th Overall Trophée d'Or Féminin
2017
 5th SwissEver GP Cham-Hagendorn
 7th Overall Setmana Ciclista Valenciana
2018
 6th SwissEver GP Cham-Hagendorn
2019
 4th Grand Prix International d'Isbergues

References

External links
 
 

1993 births
Living people
Italian female cyclists
Cyclists from the Province of Belluno
People from Feltre
University of Pisa alumni